Don Chastain (September 2, 1935 – August 9, 2002) was an American actor, singer, and screenwriter. He worked in television in Los Angeles and New York and toured the United States and Canada.

Early years
Chastain was born in Oklahoma City, Oklahoma.

Acting
Chastain's Broadway credits include Parade (1998), 42nd Street (1980), It's a Bird...It's a Plane...It's Superman (1965), and No Strings (1961).

He played Jim Thompson in the TV comedy The Debbie Reynolds Show (1969–1970) and Scott Thomas in the TV comedy Hello, Larry (1979–1981).

He penned the screenplay for The Mafu Cage (1978) and wrote several episodes of As the World Turns (1992–1995).

In 1960, Chastain appeared as Gerald Wiley in the episode "Trial by Rope" of the TV series Colt .45. The guest cast also included Pamela Duncan as Dora Lacey, and Lurene Tuttle as Lottie Strong. Other series in which Chastain appeared as a guest star include The Real McCoys, Rhoda, Maude, The Rockford Files, All My Children, Hawaii Five-O, The West Wing, Gunsmoke, Scrubs, and The Big Valley.

He appeared in the role of Lizard in the 1970 film of C.C. and Company.

One of Chastain's final roles on TV was as a “suspect” On the television reality competition show “Murder in Small Town X” in 2001 as character Hayden DeBeck. He was featured for 6 episodes before being “killed” by the show's fictional killer.

Music
Chastain was a jazz singer and lyricist who served in the United States Army.

Personal life 
Don Chastain died August 9, 2002, of cancer in Los Angeles. He was 66. He is survived by his wife Jill and their son Colin.

Broadway performances

 No Strings (1962–1963)
 It's a Bird...It's a Plane...It's Superman (1966)
 42nd Street (1980–1989)
 Dance a Little Closer (1983)
 Parade (1998–1999)

References

External links

 http://www.chastaincentral.com/content/don.html
 
 
 
 

1935 births
2002 deaths
American male stage actors
American male television actors
American male film actors
Male actors from Oklahoma City
American soap opera writers
Deaths from colorectal cancer
Deaths from cancer in California
Writers from Oklahoma City
Screenwriters from Oklahoma
20th-century American male actors
American male television writers
20th-century American screenwriters
20th-century American male writers